T. cinnabarina may refer to:

 Trametes cinnabarina, a saprobic fungus
 Tremella cinnabarina, a Tahitian fungus
 Tubercularia cinnabarina, a filamentous ascomycete